A Water coaster is a steel roller coaster that combines roller coaster elements, such as chain lift hills and steep drops, with boat-based attraction elements, such as splash-down landings.

The boat is pulled up on the tracks and then start a trip. The finale of the water coaster consists of a steep drop that ends in a wave. This roller coaster is characterised by a gentle layout with drops and splash. Some water coasters turn into log flume style trains once they hit the water, with the traditional coaster rails ending leaving the train floating in a trough. Other types of water coasters have fixed rails all the way around the coaster.

The highest water coaster in the world is Divertical, at Mirabilandia in Italy.

List of Water Coasters

References

External links

 
Types of roller coaster
Water rides
Water rides by type